Leptochilus pteropus, synonym Microsorum pteropus, commonly known as Java fern after the Indonesian island of Java, can be found in Malaysia, Thailand, Northeast India and some regions of China. It is a highly variable plant with several different geographic varieties that vary in leaf size and shape. Found in its natural habitat growing attached to roots and rocks, it can grow in both fully and partially submerged environs. The plant can propagate through small adventitious plants formed on older leaves, which attach themselves to hard substrates.

Cultivation and uses
Java fern is one of the most popular plants in the aquarium hobby, due to its aesthetic appeal and ease of care. Several cultivars of Java fern exist, including the "narrow leaf", "needle leaf", "Windelov", "trident", and "lance leaf" variants. Cultivation in the aquarium is  usually performed by tying or glueing the roots coming from the rhizome to rock or driftwood, instead of planting it directly into the substrate.

It can be cultivated in tap water, dim or bright light, with or without gravel. It is more snail resistant and grows better with higher fish loads.

References

External links 
 The Aquarium Wiki article on caring for Java fern in the aquarium

Ferns of Asia
Freshwater plants
Plants described in 1933
Polypodiaceae
Aquarium plants